Oh, Mr Porter! is a 1937 British comedy film starring Will Hay with Moore Marriott and Graham Moffatt and directed by Marcel Varnel. While not Hay's commercially most successful (although it grossed £500,000 at the box office – equal to about £34,000,000 at 2020 value), it is probably his best-known film to modern audiences. It is widely acclaimed as the best of Hay's work, and a classic of its genre. The film had its first public showing in November 1937 and went on general release on 3 January 1938.
The plot of Oh, Mr Porter was loosely based on the Arnold Ridley play The Ghost Train. The title was taken from Oh! Mr Porter, a music hall song.

Plot

William Porter (Will Hay) is an inept railway worker who – due to family connections – is given the job of stationmaster at a remote and ramshackle rural Northern Irish railway station in the (fictitious) town of Buggleskelly, situated on the border with the then Irish Free State.

After taking the ferry from England to Northern Ireland, Porter is aghast when he discovers how isolated the station is. It is situated out in the countryside, two miles cross-country from the nearest bus stop. To make matters worse, local legend has it that the ghost of One-Eyed Joe the Miller haunts the line and, as a result, no-one will go near the station after dark.

Porter's co-workers at the station are the elderly deputy stationmaster, Harbottle (Moore Marriott), and an overweight, insolent young porter, Albert (Graham Moffatt), who make a living by stealing goods in transit and swapping railway tickets for food. They welcome Porter to his new job by regaling him with tales of the deaths and disappearances of previous stationmasters – each apparently the victim of the curse of One-Eyed Joe.

From the beginning, the station is run very unprofessionally. Porter is woken up by a cow sticking its head through the window of the old railway carriage he is sleeping in (the cow has been lost in transit and is being milked by Harbottle), and the team's breakfast consists of bacon made from a litter of piglets which the railway is supposed to be looking after for a local farmer.

Determined to shake things up (particularly after he is forced to deal with the irate farmer when he comes to collect his pigs), Stationmaster Porter tries to renovate the station in several ways, most sensibly by painting the entire station, but also by less conventional means – including stopping the passing express and organising an excursion to Connemara.

Porter attempts to drum up business among the local people in the pub by offering tickets to this excursion, but as the locals begin to argue about where the excursion should go a fight breaks out. Porter crawls to safety in the landlord's rooms next door, where he meets a one-eyed man who introduces himself as Joe and offers to buy all of the tickets for an away game that the village football team, the Buggleskelly Wednesday, are playing the following day.

But Porter is unaware that he has really agreed to transport a group of criminals who are involved in running guns to the Irish Free State. The 'football' train leaves at six a.m. the following morning, rather than the scheduled ten a.m., at the insistence of Joe and although Porter questions some of the odd packages being loaded onto the train, he accepts Joe's claim that these are in fact goalposts for the game.

The train disappears as the smugglers divert it down a disused branch line near the border, and with everybody claiming that Porter has lost his mind (there is no such team as Buggleskelly Wednesday, and Harbottle points out that the local team wouldn't leave without him as he is their centre forward). Unfortunately this huge misunderstanding causes Porter to lose his job, since no one has seen the train. Then after his co-workers talk about a tunnel on a nearby disused branch line, Porter decides to head off to track down the errant engine (in hopes of getting his job back).

The trio find the missing train inside a derelict railway tunnel, underneath a supposedly haunted windmill. They investigate and are briefly captured by the gun runners, but escape and climb progressively higher up the windmill until eventually they are trapped at the top.

Using the windmill sails, they contrive to get down where they hatch a plan to capture the gun runners. Coupling the carriages containing the criminals and their guns to their own engine, Gladstone, they carry them away from the border at full speed, burning everything from Harbottle's underwear to level crossing gates they smash through in order to keep up steam. To keep the criminals quiet, Albert climbs on top of the carriage and hits anyone who sticks their head out with a large shovel.

Porter writes a note explaining the situation and places it in Harbottle's empty 'medicine' bottle. When they pass a large station, he throws the bottle through the window of the stationmaster's office, alerting the authorities to their plight. The entire railway goes into action, with lines being closed and other trains re-routed so that Gladstone can finally crash into a siding where the waiting police force arrest the gun runners.

After a short-lived celebration, in which Harbottle points out that Gladstone is ninety years old and Porter claims it is good for another ninety, the engine explodes after its hectic journey, and Porter, Harbottle and Albert lower their hats in respect.

Cast
Will Hay as William Porter
Moore Marriott as Jeremiah Harbottle
Graham Moffatt as Albert Brown
Percy Walsh as Superintendent
Dave O'Toole as Postman
Sebastian Smith as Mr Trimbletow
Agnes Lauchlan as Mrs Trimbletow
Dennis Wyndham as Grogan/One-Eyed Joe
Frederick Piper as Ledbetter
Frederick Lloyd as Minister
Frank Atkinson as Irishman in bar
 Betty Jardine as Secretary

Production
Despite the majority of the film being set in Northern Ireland, none of the filming took place there; the railway station at Buggleskelly was the disused Cliddesden railway station on the Basingstoke and Alton Light Railway, which had closed to goods in 1936. Oh, Mr Porter! was filmed at Cliddesden between May and July 1937. All the interior shots were made at Gainsborough Studios, Shepherds Bush, during the August. The windmill in which Porter and his colleagues are trapped is located at Terling, Essex, and "Gladstone", the ancient steam locomotive, was portrayed by No. 2 Northiam 2-4-0T built by Hawthorn Leslie in 1899 and loaned by the Kent and East Sussex Railway to the film. The engine was returned to the company after completion of the film and remained in service until 1941, when it was scrapped.

The title sequence uses scenes shot at a variety of locations on the Waterloo to Southampton railway line and also between Maze Hill and Greenwich in south-east London. The scene in which Porter travels to Buggleskelly by bus, while being warned of a terrible danger by locals, parodies that of the Tod Browning film, Dracula (1931).

The Southern Railway of Northern Ireland that Porter works for is fictitious. In reality, from the route chosen on the map, the line would have belonged to the Great Northern Railway (Ireland), with Buggleskelly being close to the real town of Lisnaskea. In addition, the Irish border on the map portrayed in the film is inaccurate, placing the border too far east, and roughly along the eastern coast of Lough Erne rather than the border of County Fermanagh.

Reception
The film has been very well received over time.

The British Film Institute included the film in its 360 Classic Feature Films list; Variety magazine described the movie as "amusing, if over-long", noting that there was "[n]o love interest to mar the comedy"; and the cult website TV Cream listed it at number 41 in its list of cinema's Top 100 Films.

The film critic Barry Norman included it among his 100 best films of all time, and fellow critic Derek Malcolm also included the film in his Century of Films, describing it as "perfectly representing a certain type of bumbling British humour", despite being directed by a Parisian director.

The director Marcel Varnel considered the film as among his best work, and it was described in 2006, by The Times in its obituary for writer Val Guest, as "a comic masterpiece of the British cinema". Jimmy Perry, in his autobiography, wrote that the trio of Captain Mainwaring, Corporal Jones and Private Pike in Dad's Army was inspired by watching Oh, Mr Porter!

Legacy 
The Will Hay Appreciation Society unveiled a memorial bench to Will Hay, Moore Marriott and Graham Moffatt in October 2018, in Cliddesden, Hampshire, the filming location for Buggleskelly. The bench was unveiled by Pete Waterman.

Reviews

Modern reviews

Spinning Image Review
Bootleg Files Review
Screenonline Review

Contemporary reviews
Variety Magazine Review, 1937
BFI Monthly Film Bulletin Review, October 1937

Parody
The film was parodied in the Harry Enfield spoof documentary Norbert Smith - a Life, as Oh, Mr Bank Robber! starring "Will Silly".

References

External links
 
 Article on the song, with a sound file of the tune
 Guardian article on the film
 "Full Steam Ahead"
 Link to video clip of Oh, Mr Porter
 "First Stop Buggleskelly" – the Basingstoke and Alton Light Railway

1937 films
1937 comedy films
British black-and-white films
British comedy films
1930s English-language films
Films directed by Marcel Varnel
Gainsborough Pictures films
Rail transport films
Films with screenplays by Marriott Edgar
Films set in Northern Ireland
Films scored by Jack Beaver
1930s British films